The 1979 Critérium du Dauphiné Libéré was the 31st edition of the cycle race and was held from 21 May to 28 May 1979. The race started in Mâcon and finished in Annecy. The race was won by Bernard Hinault of the Renault team.

Teams
Ten teams, containing a total of 100 riders, participated in the race:

Route

General classification

References

1979
1979 in French sport
May 1979 sports events in Europe
1979 Super Prestige Pernod